In physical chemistry, the Evans–Polanyi principle (also referred to as the Bell–Evans–Polanyi principle, Brønsted–Evans–Polanyi principle, or Evans–Polanyi–Semenov principle) observes that the difference in activation energy between two reactions of the same family is proportional to the difference of their enthalpy of reaction.

This relationship can be expressed as

 

where

  is the activation energy of a reference reaction of the same class,
  is the enthalpy of reaction,
  characterizes the position of the transition state along the reaction coordinate (such that ).

The Evans–Polanyi model is a linear energy relationship that serves as an efficient way to calculate activation energy of many reactions within a distinct family. The activation energy may be used to characterize the kinetic rate parameter of a given reaction through application of the Arrhenius equation.

The Evans–Polanyi model assumes that the pre-exponential factor of the Arrhenius equation and the position of the transition state along the reaction coordinate are the same for all reactions belonging to a particular reaction family.

Derivation
The Bell–Evans–Polanyi model was developed independently by Ronald Percy Bell and by Meredith Gwynne Evans and Michael Polanyi to explain the apparent linear relationship between activation energy and free energy in acid disassociation, as described in the Brønsted catalysis equation, which was the original linear free-energy relationship published in 1924.

Consider the reaction

 

The system is assumed to have two degrees of freedom: rAB, the distance between atoms A and B, and rBC, the distance between atoms B and C. The distance between A and C is assumed to be fixed such that

 

As the A—B bond stretches, the energy of the system increases up to the activation energy associated with the transition state, whereupon the bond breaks. The energy then decreases as the B—C bond is formed. Evans and Polanyi approximated the two energy functions between reactants, the transition state, and the products by two straight lines (with slopes m1 and m2 respectively) that intersect at the transition state.

For the AB molecule, the energy is given as a function of bond distance r:

At the transition state, r = r‡ and E = Ea. Therefore, we can write that

which rearranges to give

For the BC molecule, a similar expression of energy as a function of r is given by

The overall enthalpy change ΔH of the system can thus be expressed as

Plugging equation  into equation  and rearranging gives the following:

The constants in equation  can be condensed into the common form of the Evans–Polanyi equation given above.

See also
 Free-energy relationship
 Brønsted catalysis equation

References

Notes

Enthalpy
Thermochemistry